María Roncesvalles Solana Arana (born 5 October 1975) is a Navarrese politician, Minister of Education of Navarre from April 2017 to August 2019 and Spokesperson of the Government of Navarre from September 2016 to August 2019.

References

1975 births
Government ministers of Navarre
Geroa Bai politicians
Living people
Politicians from Navarre